A ten-cent coin or ten-cent piece is a coin minted for various decimal currencies worth 10 cents.

Examples include:
 the United States ten-cent coin, better known as the US dime
 the Canadian ten-cent coin, better known as the Canadian dime
 the Australian ten-cent coin
 the New Zealand ten-cent coin
 the Hong Kong ten-cent coin
 the Singapore ten-cent coin
 the Brunei ten-cent coin
 the dubbeltje, ten-cent coin of the decimal Dutch guilder (Netherlands)
 the 10 cent euro coin used in several European countries known as the eurozone
 the Namibian ten-cent coin
 the ten-cent coin of the South African rand

See also
 :Category:Ten-cent coins